Fairland is a town in southern Ottawa County, Oklahoma, United States. The population was 1,057 at the 2010 U. S. Census, an increase from the figure of 1,025 recorded in 2000. The town is in the historic Cherokee Nation.

History
Fairland was laid out along the St. Louis and San Francisco Railway (Frisco) tracks that were laid from Missouri to Vinita in 1871. The town originally covered 225 acres and consisted of a few businesses and residences that had moved there from the Prairie Springs area.

By the time Oklahoma became a  state, Fairland was an active farming community. In 1912, the Missouri, Oklahoma and Gulf Railway, later the Kansas, Oklahoma and Gulf Railway (KO&G), constructed a track through Fairland  that crossed the earlier Frisco line.

Agriculture remained the mainstay of the local economy until the end of World War II. In 1945, B. F. Goodrich opened a tire manufacturing plant near Miami that became the major contributor to Fairland's economy. The town organized a volunteer fire department and built a sewer system about 1950. The Fairland School district absorbed several smaller districts. However, KO&G abandoned and removed its tracks about the same time.

The Goodrich plant closed permanently in February 1985. The loss to Fairland's economy was offset by the opening of several communities on the shore of Grand Lake O' the Cherokees.

Geography
Fairland is located at  (36.750185, -94.848203).

The town sits on a small rise in the landscape, which is the headwaters of three creeks: Hudson Creek watershed to the Northwest, the Ogeechee Creek watershed to the East, and the Horse Creek Watershed to the Southwest. All of these creeks eventually drain into the Neosho River.

Demographics

As of the census of 2000, there were 1,025 people, 415 households, and 292 families residing in the town. There were 452 housing units at an average density of 489.2 per square mile (189.7/km2). The racial makeup of the town was 71.80% White, 0.20% African American, 20.39% Native American, 0.10% Pacific Islander, 0.10% from other races, and 7.41% from two or more races. Hispanic or Latino of any race were 0.88% of the population.

There were 415 households, out of which 32.3% had e age of 18 living with them, 53.3% were married couples living together, 14.2% had a female householder with no husband present, and 29.6% were non-families. 27.5% of all households were made up of individuals, and 15.9% had someone living alone who was 65 years of age or older. The average household size was 2.41 and the average family size was 2.89.

In the town, the population was spread out, with 24.2% under the age of 18, 8.6% from 18 to 24, 24.6% from 25 to 44, 20.7% from 45 to 64, and 22.0% who were 65 years of age or older. The median age was 39 years. For every 100 females, there were 86.0 males. For every 100 females age 18 and over, there were 82.0 males.

The median income for a household in the town was $27,240, and the median income for a family was $28,885. Males had a median income of $28,155 versus $15,208 for females. The per capita income for the town was $12,024. About 8.1% of families and 12.4% of the population were below the poverty line, including 18.0% of those under age 18 and 12.1% of those age 65 or over.

Notable people
 J. R. Conrad, National Football League player for the New England Patriots and New York Jets
 Lloyd Kiva New (Cherokee, 1916–2002), fashion designer and co-founder of the Institute of American Indian Arts, was born in Fairland.

See also

 List of municipalities in Oklahoma

Notes

References

External links

 Encyclopedia of Oklahoma History and Culture.  "Fairland"

Towns in Ottawa County, Oklahoma
Towns in Oklahoma